Siam Football Club (Thai: สโมสรฟุตบอลสยาม), is a Thailand professional football club based in Nonthaburi. The club was founded in 2011 as Rangsit Football Club. The club is currently playing in the Thai League 3 Bangkok metropolitan region.

History
The club was established in 2011 as Rangsit Football Club and later renamed to BGC Football Club. It is a reserve team of BG Pathum United.

In 2019, the club had taken over and renamed to Siam Football Club competed in Thai League 4.

Stadium and locations

Season by season record

P = Played
W = Games won
D = Games drawn
L = Games lost
F = Goals for
A = Goals against
Pts = Points
Pos = Final position

QR1 = First Qualifying Round
QR2 = Second Qualifying Round
R1 = Round 1
R2 = Round 2
R3 = Round 3
R4 = Round 4

R5 = Round 5
R6 = Round 6
QF = Quarter-finals
SF = Semi-finals
RU = Runners-up
W = Winners

Players

Current squad

Honours
Khǒr Royal Cup
Winner : 2011 (as Bangkok Glass Sport Association)
Khor Royal Cup
Runner-up : 2008-09 (as Bangkok Glass Sport Association)

References

External links
 Club's info from Thai League official website
 Official Facebook page of Siam Football Club

Association football clubs established in 2011
Football clubs in Thailand
Pathum Thani province
2011 establishments in Thailand